Lee Sun-mi (born Sun Mi on May 2, 1992), known mononymously as Sunmi (stylized as SUNMI), is a South Korean singer, dancer, songwriter and record producer. She debuted in 2007 as a member of South Korean girl group Wonder Girls and left the group in 2010 to pursue her studies. After a three-year hiatus, Sunmi resumed her career as a soloist with her 2013 debut extended play, Full Moon, spawning the number two singles "24 Hours" and "Full Moon" on the national Gaon Digital Chart.

In 2015, Sunmi was announced to be resuming promotion with the Wonder Girls and remained with the group until their disbandment in 2017. She subsequently left JYP Entertainment and joined Makeus Entertainment (now known as Abyss Company), releasing the hit single "Gashina". Her second extended play, Warning, was released in 2018 and produced two other hit singles: "Heroine" and "Siren".

Early life
Sunmi was born on May 2, 1992, in Iksan, North Jeolla, South Korea. She attended Hwangnam Elementary School, Chungdam Middle School and Chungdam High School, and majored in musical theater at Dongguk University.

Sunmi revealed on a 2018 episode of Talkmon that she first decided to become a celebrity when she was 12 after her father was admitted to hospital due to complications of pulmonary tuberculosis. She was inspired by BoA, who debuted at the age of 13, and it was for her "the fastest way to make money" in order to take care of her mother and two younger brothers. She went to Seoul to audition and became a JYP Entertainment trainee at 14, though her father passed away three months before her debut with Wonder Girls. She later adopted her stepfather's surname Lee while in university and merged her original given name and surname, becoming Lee Sun-mi.

Career

2006–2012: Debut with Wonder Girls, hiatus
In May 2006, Sunmi was revealed as the fourth member of Wonder Girls, a girl group managed by JYP Entertainment. The group debuted with the single "Irony", on February 10, 2007, and quickly rose to stardom with their hits "Tell Me", "So Hot" and "Nobody" within two years of debuting. Sunmi participated with the group in American activities, touring alongside the Jonas Brothers, under the nickname Mimi.

In January 2010, JYP announced that Sunmi would be postponing her musical career to pursue her studies, but would continue until February in order to complete scheduled events. On January 13, 2012, a JYP representative stated that "Sunmi has remained within the company and continues to sharpen her musical talents." JYP Entertainment later stated that there were no plans for Sunmi to return and comeback as a member of Wonder Girls.

2013–2016: Solo debut with Full Moon, Wonder Girls return 
In August 2013, Sunmi was announced to be returning to her music career, debuting as a solo artist. Sunmi made her official debut stage on August 22, on Mnet's M! Countdown. Her debut single "24 Hours" was released on August 26, 2013, and subsequently achieved an all-kill on music charts. Subsequently, her debut extended play Full Moon was released on February 17, 2014 along with the promotional single of the same name. The latter peaked at number two on the Gaon Digital Chart and at number three on Billboard's K-pop Hot 100. "Full Moon" was praised for being innovative, and Sunmi was said to have delivered a classy rendition of "sexy".

On June 24, 2015, JYP Entertainment announced that Sunmi would be re-joining Wonder Girls, after withdrawing in 2010, for their comeback after the group's two-year hiatus. The group returned with a band concept, with Sunmi playing the bass. In August, the group's album Reboot was released, with Sunmi co-writing and co-producing three of its tracks. In 2016, Sunmi once again received songwriting and producing credits for a Wonder Girls release, this time for two songs present on the band's single album Why So Lonely, including the title track of the same name.

2017–2021: Group final disbandment, Warning, tour, and 1/6

On January 26, 2017, it was announced that Wonder Girls were to disband after unsuccessful contract renewal negotiation with members Yeeun and Sunmi. The group released their final single "Draw Me" on February 10, 2017 which also served as a celebration for their tenth anniversary. In March, Sunmi signed with Makeus Entertainment. In August, she released her single "Gashina", produced by Teddy Park of The Black Label. The song debuted at number 2 on the Gaon Digital Chart before topping the chart the following week, and was named the third best k-pop song of 2017 by Billboard.

Sunmi returned with a single titled "Heroine" on January 18, 2018. She described the single as a prequel to "Gashina". On September 4, Sunmi released her second EP, titled Warning, along with the lead single, "Siren". "Siren" received an all-kill on six local music charts. Warning was named the third best k-pop album of 2018 by Billboard and Bravo. "Addict" was named the eighth best k-pop b-side of the year by MTV.

From February to June 2019, Sunmi held her first world tour, titled "Warning". She performed in 18 cities across Asia, America and Europe. In the midst of the tour, on March 4, 2019, Sunmi released a single titled "Noir". After completing the world tour she released her single "Lalalay" on August 27, 2019.

On February 6, 2020, Sunmi released the single "Gotta Go" along with its instrumental as part of the original sound track of the web series XX in which she made a cameo. Two days later, a dance performance for the song was released which later became the channel's most popular video after reaching over 4 million views. On May 21, it was revealed that Sunmi would be making a comeback in late June. Her single "Pporappippam" was released on June 29.
On July 22, she was selected as the exclusive model of 요괴미식가 (the Korean version of Yokai Kitchen) created by FriendTimes, in the TV commercial of the game, she played a gourmet who enjoyed cooking in the mysterious spirit realm restaurant.
On August 12, she and J. Y. Park released the duet "When We Disco". She also featured on label mate Park Won's song "Oh Yeah" from his album My Fuxxxxx Romance.

Sunmi released her new single album Tail on February 23, 2021, with the lead single of the same name.

Sunmi released her third EP 1/6 (One Sixth) on August 6, 2021, with the lead single "You Can't Sit with Us".

On October 11, Sunmi released the new digital single "Go or Stop?". The single was released as part of a collaboration with DWG KIA, a League of Legends esports team who won the 2020 World Championship.

2022–present: Summer comeback
On June 8, 2022, Sunmi's agency announced that she was preparing for a comeback with a single titled "Heart Burn" on June 29.

On June 30, 2022, the agency announced Sunmi's world tour '2022 SUNMI TOUR 'GOOD GIRL GONE MAD' through its official SNS channel. It will be held in Europe and America.

Artistry

Musical style and themes: "Sunmi-pop" 

Sunmi is known in the K-pop industry to have created her own musical style called "Sunmi-pop". It maintains K-pop's core influences such as pop, disco, rock, traditional Korean music plus retro and city pop elements mixed with Sunmi's own defined music identity.

The concept of "Sunmi-pop" was first mentioned by Sunmi herself on You Hee-yeol's Sketchbook at the start of 2018. Later in the year, in an interview for 1TheK's YouTube channel published in September 2018, she revealed that her personal goal was to create her own music style named after herself. The interview was published at a time coinciding with the release of Warning (her first extended play since her renewal as a solo artist) and she referred to the newly published EP as "a stepping stone from which [she] can build [her] own music style".

One week ahead of the release of her single "Noir", she mentioned her main goal during a detailed interview for Billboard Korea, hoping that her musical style would become something that could inspire other artists. K-pop fans around the world started to acknowledge Sunmi's own musical identity by using for the first time the word "Sunmi-pop" in a few tweets, although the term became common on social media only after her fans used it to reply to a tweet posted by Sunmi herself. Even though the tweet itself didn't mention the term, Korean media and industry players started to officially recognize the word "Sunmi-pop" and implement it in articles and variety shows for the first time to describe Sunmi's music, reporting that she created her own style by applying her abilities in self-writing, self-composing and ideating performances.

On May 30, 2019, in London, right before going up on the stage of the Warning World Tour, an interviewer of the Korean media agency Yonhap News made known to Sunmi that a term to describe her musical style had been coined already as "Sunmi-pop". Thus the word "Sunmi-pop" gained its officiality, and on August 21, 2019, her agency Abyss Company (then known as Makeus Entertainment) also recognized the newly coined word by sharing an article from Naver News which dedicated a section to "Sunmi genre, Sunmi-pop" in anticipation of her comeback with "Lalalay".

Characteristics of "Sunmi-pop" 

The main characteristic of "Sunmi-pop" is defined by the emotions that the songs convey and provoke in the listener. According to Sunmi: "there's always a slightly sad emotion that permeates [my music] no matter how excitingly I sing the song" and "it's energetic and happy but with a sense of sadness". "Sunmi-pop" songs feature upbeat dance rhythms with lyrics marked by metaphors and double meanings that slightly conceal a sense of cynicism.

Since "Gashina", Sunmi's title tracks have featured double meanings and wordplays in the song title such as "Siren", expressing both the meaning of the warning sound and the mythological figure of the siren, and "Lalalay" which both refers to the act of flying [like a butterfly] and the word nallari (날라리) meaning 'punk' or 'party-goer' in Korean. Additionally, the songs "Gashina", "Heroine", "Siren", "Black Pearl", "Curve", "Lalalay" and "Tail" all present metaphors in the lyrics thus defining Sunmi's style of expression. Although "Sunmi-pop" songs mostly present an exciting and happy beat, Sunmi shared that her lyrics are often imbued with a sense of cynicism due to the fact that, in her real life, as a celebrity, she can't always express her true feelings. Metaphors, wordplays and double meanings are often expressed through choreographies that complement her work.

Though "Sunmi-pop" isn't constricted within a single music style or genre, electro-pop and retro elements are often associated with Sunmi's songs. The reason why these elements emerge is to be found in Sunmi's roots as a member of the Wonder Girls and her time in the US. Sunmi said in a recent interview that producer J. Y. Park wanted her and the other members to "broaden [their] understanding of the different music styles of different eras" focusing especially on retro concepts and Motown artists, which she ended up liking. In a Billboard interview she revealed: "Personally, I like music from the ‘70s, ’80s, and ‘90s, so I try to find instrumentals and sounds that evoke those periods and work them into my music".

"Sunmi-pop" is also considered by Sunmi to be a combination of popularity and identity. On the April 2021 issue of L’Officiel Singapore, Sunmi explained: "I always try to come up with fun and easy ways to approach a range of people, while keeping the original emotions in myself". While her aesthetic or themes are considered to be niche, her goal is to remain inside the world of popular music.

Another key element of "Sunmi-pop" is dynamism: Sunmi shared her wish of wanting to try new ideas every time, like working with other producers, and explore new genres by showing a different range of themes, aesthetics and sounds through the years.

Personal Life 
Sunmi has been diagnosed with Borderline Personality Disorder. She opened up about her struggle in her song "Borderline" released August 2021.

Discography

Extended plays

Single albums

Singles

Composition credits

Filmography

Television series

Web series

Television shows

Web shows

Music videos

Concert and tours

Sunmi the 1st World Tour: Warning

2022 Sunmi Tour Good Girl Gone Mad

Online concerts 
 Good Girl Gone Mad (2021)

Awards and nominations

Listicles

Notes

References

External links

1992 births
Living people
Wonder Girls members
Dongguk University alumni
JYP Entertainment artists
MAMA Award winners
English-language singers from South Korea
Japanese-language singers of South Korea
Mandarin-language singers of South Korea
People with borderline personality disorder
South Korean dance musicians
South Korean female idols
South Korean women pop singers
South Korean television personalities